Sunlight Studios is a recording studio in Stockholm, Sweden which is run by Tomas Skogsberg.

It has been a popular choice for Swedish death metal bands such as Dismember, At The Gates, Entombed, Grave, Katatonia and Tiamat.

Records

1989
Treblinka - Severe Abominations
Therion - Time Shall Tell
Nihilist - Only Shreds Remain

1990
Carnage - Dark Recollections
Entombed - Left Hand Path
Tiamat - Sumerian Cry
Grotesque - Incantation
Carbonized - No Canonization

1991
Darkthrone - Soulside Journey
Dismember - Like an Ever Flowing Stream
Entombed - Clandestine
Grave - Into the Grave
Therion - Of Darkness...
Merciless - The Treasures Within
Sorcery - Bloodchilling Tales
Xysma - Yeah

1992
Amorphis - The Karelian Isthmus
Obscure Infinity - Beyond the Gate
Afflicted - Prodigal Sun
Cemetary - An Evil Shade of Grey
Vader - The Ultimate Incantation First Recording Session

1993
Dismember - Indecent & Obscene
Entombed - Wolverine Blues
Desultory - Into Eternity
Necrophobic - The Nocturnal Silence
At The Gates - With Fear I Kiss the Burning Darkness
Utumno - Across The Horizon

1994
Amorphis - Tales from the Thousand Lakes
Amorphis - Black Winter Day

1995
Dismember - Massive Killing Capacity

1996
Amorphis - Elegy

1997
Dismember - Death Metal
Entombed - DCLXVI: To Ride Shoot Straight and Speak the Truth
Vibrion - Closed Frontiers

1998
Katatonia - Discouraged Ones

1999
Katatonia - Tonight's Decision

2001
Katatonia - Last Fair Deal Gone Down

2013
Jesus Chrüsler Supercar - Among The Ruins And Desolate Lands

2018
Befouled - Refuse to Rot

2022
Xorsist - Deadly Possession

References
 A chronological "discography" of the studio can be found 
carnagedeathmetal.de – SUNLIGHT STUDIO (SWE)

Recording studios in Sweden
Music in Stockholm